Xavier Prats Monné (born 1956 in Tarragona, Spain) is a Spanish former high-ranking official of the European Commission, who served as Director-General of the Directorate-General for Health and Food Safety (2015–2018) and Director-General at the Directorate-General for Education and Culture (2014–2015).

Background

Born in Tarragona, Spain, he completed his primary and secondary education at the Istituto Massimo of Rome, Italy. He majored in social anthropology at the Complutense University of Madrid, and holds degrees in development economics from the International Centre for Advanced Mediterranean Agronomic Studies in France; and in European Affairs from the College of Europe in Belgium, where he graduated first of the Class of 1981–82 (the Johan Willem Beyen Promotion) and served as assistant professor. He is fluent in Spanish, English, French, Italian, and Catalan.

European Commission career

He previously was a high-ranking official of the European Commission, as: Director General of the Directorate-General for Health and Food Safety (2015-2018), Deputy Director General (2010–2014) and Director General (2014–2015) at the Directorate-General for Education and Culture. As Director-general for Health and Food Safety he was responsible for the promotion of public health, the assessment of national healthcare systems' performance, animal health and welfare, and the strengthening of Europe's capacity to deal with crisis situations in human health and food safety. As Director-general for Education and Culture, the main policy areas under his responsibility were: the modernisation of European education and training systems; educational mobility, including the "Erasmus" programme for students; and international relations in the field of education, culture and youth. He represents the European Commission (EC) at the European Institute for Innovation and Technology (EIT).

From mid-2007 till the end-2010, he served as the EC Director for employment policy, Europe 2020 Strategy and international relations in the field of employment; in this capacity, he was also responsible for relations between the EC and the International Labour Organization (ILO), and EC "sherpa" representative at the G20 Labour Ministers meeting. He was also, from 2007 to end-2010, one of the five founding members of the EC Impact Assessment Board, which vets all impact assessments produced by the institution and reports directly to the President. He previously served as: Director for the European Social Fund; Deputy Chief of Staff of the EC Vice-President for external relations; Advisor of the EC Commissioner for Regional policy; assistant to the European Commission Spokesperson; Administrator at the Directorate General for Development policy and at the General Secretariat of the European Commission.

Later work
Prats Monné left the European Commission in 2018. Since 2018 he is a special advisor at Teach For All, a non-profit organisation.

References

1956 births
College of Europe alumni
Spanish officials of the European Union
People from Tarragona
Living people